The Glen Addie Volunteer Hose Company Fire Hall, at Fourth St. and Pine Ave. in Anniston, Alabama, was built in 1885.  It was listed on the National Register of Historic Places in 1985.

It is an early Richardsonian Romanesque-style two-story brick building.

References

		
National Register of Historic Places in Calhoun County, Alabama
Romanesque Revival architecture in Alabama
Fire stations completed in 1885
Fire stations on the National Register of Historic Places in Alabama
1885 establishments in Alabama
Buildings and structures in Anniston, Alabama